Jeffrey Bass (born May 16, 1961), is an American record producer from Detroit, Michigan, best known as one half of the Bass Brothers and for his work with Eminem. Bass is considered one of the most influential people in Eminem's career.

Career 
At age 16, Bass, along with 4 of his childhood friends formed Detroit-based R&B group Dreamboy.  In 1980, when Bass was 19 years old, Dreamboy was signed to Qwest Records, a record label created by Quincy Jones that same year. The group released their debut album in 1983, and a follow-up in 1984 before their contract expired and they were dropped from the label in 1985.

Bass would eventually go on to co-produce the song "Lose Yourself," alongside Eminem which won the Oscar for Best Original Song at the 75th Academy Awards. The song was featured in the film 8 Mile, which starred Eminem in his movie debut. Eminem and Bass previously shared a Grammy Award for 1999's Best Rap Album, The Slim Shady LP. Bass was also the speaker in "Public Service Announcement" and "Public Service Announcement 2000" (from The Slim Shady LP and The Marshall Mathers LP respectively), two tracks that serve as introductions to the albums they are featured in.

Awards and nominations

!
|-
|align=center|1999
|The Slim Shady LP
|Grammy Award for Best Rap Album
|
|rowspan="7"| 
|-
|align=center|2000
|The Marshall Mathers LP
|rowspan="2"|Grammy Award for Album of the Year
|
|-
|rowspan="2"|2002
|The Eminem Show
|
|-
|"Without Me"
|Grammy Award for Record of the Year
|
|-
|rowspan="3"|2003
|rowspan="3"|"Lose Yourself"
|Grammy Award for Best Song Written for a Motion Picture, Television or Other Visual Media
|
|-
|Grammy Award for Song of the Year
|
|-
|Grammy Award for Best Rap Song
|
|-

References 

1961 births
Living people
Record producers from Ohio
Record producers from Michigan
Best Original Song Academy Award-winning songwriters
Grammy Award winners for rap music
Musicians from Shaker Heights, Ohio